The Battle of Tabasco may refer to two battles fought during the Mexican–American War.
 First Battle of Tabasco – fought in October, 1846
 Second Battle of Tabasco – fought in June, 1847